Rho-related BTB domain-containing protein 2 is a protein that in humans is encoded by the RHOBTB2 gene.

RHOBTB2 is a member of the evolutionarily-conserved RhoBTB subfamily of Rho GTPases. For background information on RhoBTBs, see RHOBTB1 (MIM 607351).[supplied by OMIM]

Clinical significance
Mutations affecting RHOBTB2 can cause epilepsy, learning difficulties and movement disorders. RHOBTB2-related disorders are autosomal dominant, meaning only one of the two copies of the gene needs to be mutated to cause disease. The mutations usually occur de novo – that is, as a new mutation occurring in the affected individual rather than having been inherited.

References

Further reading